The Encyclopædia Edinensis was a six-volume general encyclopedia published in Edinburgh in 1827, and intended for a popular audience. It was edited by James Millar, who died just before it was complete.

Editorial staff
James Millar, principal editor
Jeremiah Kirby and Richard Poole, main editors and contributors. Poole wrote articles on "Mental Diseases".
John Sommers, minister at Falkirk, was proprietor and also editor for the last three volumes.

Work began on the Encyclopædia in 1816. Millar edited the fourth and parted of the fifth editions of the Encyclopædia Britannica and had contributed extensively to both. His goal with the Edinensis was to create a more popular work. However, his use of a large quarto format, reminiscent of the Britannica hampered the project as duodecimal, miniature formats were then in vogue.

Phrenology 

The editorial line was quite sympathetic to phrenology. According to the Phrenological Journal, Sommers approved the inclusion of the uncritical article "Phrenology". Poole in 1819 wrote for the encyclopedia an article on education, an early treatment from the point of phrenology.

Other contributors
John Adamson of Newton
Alexander Anderson, Polar Expeditions etc.
George Buchanan, Astronomy and Dialling
James Couper
John Dick M.D., Midwifery
Alexander Duncan, Miracle etc.
James Flint
William Galbraith, Navigation
Patrick Gibson, design
Rev. David Liston, Calcutta, Mechanics
Henry Liston, Music
Robert Macmillan
Lockhart Muirhead
Rev. Thomas Nelson, Religion
Alexander Peterkin
Rev. Dr. Russel of Leith, Magnetism and Meteorology
John Sommers
Walter Tod, Theology etc.
John Wallace
Robert Wallace.

References

External links 
Encyclopedia Edinensis; or, Dictionary of arts, sciences, and literature Vol. 1
Encyclopedia Edinensis; or, Dictionary of arts, sciences, and literature Vol. 2
Encyclopedia Edinensis; or, Dictionary of arts, sciences, and literature Vol. 4
Encyclopedia Edinensis; or, Dictionary of arts, sciences, and literature Vol. 5

1827 non-fiction books
Scottish encyclopedias
19th-century encyclopedias